Rocktober Blood is a 1984 horror film, directed by Beverly Sebastian and starring Tray Loren, Donna Scoggins and Cana Cockrell. It features the band Sorcery as actors and on the soundtrack.

Plot 
The film opens in a recording studio, where singer Billy "Eye" Harper is in a session working on a few tracks with his band and his girlfriend Lynn Starling, also a backup singer. After he finishes the recording, Billy and the rest of the band leave. Despite trying to record her own vocal tracks, Lynn is left to go to the jacuzzi upstairs, after refusing Kevin the recording engineer's offer to join her.

Meanwhile, Billy returns to the studio, where he finds only Kevin and Mary, Kevin's assistant. In an enigmatic move, Billy kills Kevin by slitting his throat and impales Mary on a wall-mounted coat peg. When Lynn returns, she finds Billy smoking some drugs at the recording studio's control panel. Lynn is unaware that Billy has just killed both Kevin and Mary while she was gone. Once Lynn finds out, she is saved by some security guards.

After a brief intermission, it is two years later, where it is revealed that Billy was captured, tried and executed. It is now the "Rocktober Blood Tour Press Party", and Lynn and the remaining band members are touring as "Headmistress". A VJ who interviews Lynn, asks several questions about the band's tour, as well as Billy's fall from grace, to which Lynn responds by stating that identifying Billy was "the hardest thing she ever had to do." A mysterious figure then appears in a Halloween "death" mask, and tells Lynn  to meet with Chris, the band's manager, in the office. When she arrives in the office, she is cornered by Billy, in the same death mask, who leaves her curled up, and crying on the floor. After that, Billy persistently stalks Lynn, killing people involved with her along the way, but hiding their bodies, to make others think she is crazy by claiming that Billy is after her.

Eventually Honey convinces Lynn to dig up Billy's grave. They find out that Billy is dead, and Lynn assumes that she is hallucinating. The next night, Lynn and the band are getting ready for the show, when Billy reappears and tells Lynn that he is really Billy's twin brother, John Harper, and that she identified the wrong man. John tells Lynn that the people he killed valued Billy more than him, even though he wrote the renowned songs himself. Then John chloroforms Lynn, and the show begins. A prop coffin pops up on the stage, and Lynn is revealed inside. John tells her that his plan is to kill her as the show's grand finale. When John removes his mask, however security rushes in, attacking him with an electric guitar.

John manages to scream out the final lyrics to "I'm Back" before the credits roll.

Cast
Tray Loren as Billy "Eye" Harper/John Harper
Donna Scoggins as Lynn Starling
Kevin Eddy as Kevin
Mary Well as Mary
Cana Cockrell as Honey Bear
Renee Hubbard as Donna Lewis
Nigel Benjamin as Chris Keane
Ben Sebastian as head of security
Headmistress Band
Perry Morris - Drums
Richard Taylor - Guitar
Richie King - Bass
Lon Cohen - Guitar

Soundtrack

The songs "Killer on the Loose," "I'm Back," "Rainbow Eyes" and "Watching You" on the soundtrack were recorded by the Los Angeles-based band Sorcery, who also play the part of the Headmistress band in the film.

On the tracks written and performed by Sorcery, Nigel Benjamin sang three songs: "Killer on the Loose," "I'm Back" and "Watching You." Susie Rose Major sang "Rainbow Eyes" and "Kcab m'I". The group Facedown did "Touch Me," "High School Boys," "Watch Me Rock" and "Can't Kill Rock 'n Roll." "Soul Searcher" was performed by the Eyes.

The Soundtrack and film were re-released in September 2015 by Lunaris Records.

Track listing

Personnel

Sorcery
Richard Taylor – lead guitar
Lon Cohen – rhythm guitar
Richie King – bass
Perry Morris – drums

Facedown
Susie Major – vocals
Paul Bennette – guitars
Michael Zionch – bass
Barry Brant – drums

Eyes
Nigel Benjamin – vocals
Bob Steffan – guitars
John Telsco – bass
Pat Reagen – keyboards
Richard Onri – drums

Production
Ben Sebastian – production
Ferd Sebastian – production, design
Kevin Eddy – engineer
Larry Brown – engineer

References

External links

Horrormetalsounds
Toilettovhell

1984 films
1984 independent films
1980s mystery films
1980s serial killer films
1980s teen horror films
American teen horror films
1984 horror films
American mystery horror films
American slasher films
Films directed by Beverly Sebastian
Films directed by Ferd Sebastian
1980s slasher films
Heavy metal films
1980s English-language films
1980s American films